Haldun Alagaş Sports Hall is an indoor arena located in Istanbul, Turkey. Opened in December 2000, the arena mostly hosts basketball and volleyball games. It has a seating capacity for 2,468 spectators.

Named after the three-times World and four-times European karate champion Haldun Alagaş, the sports complex is located in Ümraniye district of Istanbul, east side of Bosporus.

Features

The center serves various sport branches for over 2,000 sports people and inhabitants daily with its training facilities. Beside, it includes a library and conference hall and the car park creates a solid source of income to get by.

It is in usage of sport teams such as Istanbul Büyükşehir Belediyesi Men's Volleyball and Men's Handball Teams and Tekelspor basketball team.

References

Basketball venues in Turkey
Volleyball venues in Turkey
Sports venues in Istanbul
Indoor arenas in Turkey
Handball venues in Turkey
Sports venues completed in 2000
Ümraniye